The Utroya (in Latvian the Rītupe) is a river of Latvia and Pytalovsky and Ostrovsky Districts of Pskov Oblast of Russia, a left tributary of the Velikaya. The principal tributary is the Ludza (Russian: Lzha, right). The towns of Kārsava and Pytalovo are located on the banks of the Rītupe/Utroya.

The source of the Rītupe is Lake Meirānu in the lake district south of the town of Kārsava. The river flows north, passes  from the center of Karsava, at a short stretch makes the state border between Latvia and Russia, and crosses into the Russian territory, to Pytalovsky District of Pskov Oblast. The official name of the river in Russia is the Utroya. The river further flows northwest, passes the town of Pytalovo, crosses into Ostrovsky District, accepts the Lzha from the right, and turns north. The mouth of the Utroya is in the village of Larino.

The drainage basin of the Utroya includes areas in the northeastern Latvia, as well as almost whole Pytalovsky District, the western part of Ostrovsky District, as well as minor areas in the western part of Krasnogorodsky District of Pskov Oblast in Russia.

References

Rivers of Latvia
Rivers of Pskov Oblast
Latvia–Russia border